Doxa Italia is an American amateur soccer team based in Manhattan Beach, California, United States. Founded in 1997, the team plays in Region IV of the United States Adult Soccer Association, a network of amateur leagues at the fifth tier of the American Soccer Pyramid.

The team plays its home games at Manhattan Village Park. The team's colors are navy blue and white.

History
Doxa were formed in 1997 by former professionals Constanin Balanos and Fernando Mastrocinque, and entered the Pacific League, one of several high-level amateur leagues in the Los Angeles area. They won their divisional title in their debut season, and since then have gone on to be one of Southern California's powerhouse amateur teams. Doxa have won five Pacific League titles (in 1997, 1999, 2000, 2001 and 2002), four Coast Soccer League championships (in 2004, 2005, 2008 and 2010), and four California Soccer Association South State Cups, as well as three Las Vegas Silver Mug championships and three Santa Barbara Fiesta Tournaments.

Doxa entered the Lamar Hunt U.S. Open Cup for the first time in 2009, and narrowly missed out on qualifying for the tournament proper at the first attempt, finishing second to National Premier Soccer League side Sonoma County Sol on goal difference. They missed out again in 2010, finishing third on goal difference again behind Sacramento Gold and the Arizona Sahuaros, but qualified for the first round of the tournament proper in 2011, after overwhelming their opponents in the USASA Region IV National Cup including an 18-0 win over Tracy CV Eagles FC in which Derk Droze scored seven goals, Ilia Nazarov scored five, and Bryan Byrne scored a hat trick.

Players

2013 USOC roster

Notable former players
  Artur Aghasyan
  Alex Bengard
  Brian Dunseth
  Josh Tudela

Year-by-year

Head coaches
  Paul Rottenberg (2006-2007)
  John Gerrard (2007–2011)
  Derk Droze (2011–2012)
  Bryan Byrne (2012–2013)

Stadia
 Field at California State University, Dominguez Hills; Carson, California (2006-2008)
 Manhattan Village Park; Manhattan Beach, California (2008–present)
 Campus El Segundo Athletic Fields; El Segundo, California (2009) 1 game

References

External links
 Official site
 Coast Soccer League 2010-11
 Coast Soccer League 2009-10
 Coast Soccer League 2007-08

Soccer clubs in Greater Los Angeles
1997 establishments in California
Manhattan Beach, California